In enzymology, a tagatose kinase is an enzyme that catalyzes the chemical reaction

ATP + D-tagatose  ADP + D-tagatose 6-phosphate

Thus, the two substrates of this enzyme are ATP and D-tagatose, whereas its two products are ADP and D-tagatose 6-phosphate.

This enzyme belongs to the family of transferases, specifically those transferring phosphorus-containing groups (phosphotransferases) with an alcohol group as acceptor.  The systematic name of this enzyme class is ATP:D-tagatose 6-phosphotransferase. Other names in common use include tagatose 6-phosphate kinase (phosphorylating), D-tagatose 6-phosphate kinase, and tagatose-6-phosphate kinase.  This enzyme participates in galactose metabolism.

Structural studies

As of late 2007, only one structure has been solved for this class of enzymes, with the PDB accession code .

References 

 

EC 2.7.1
Enzymes of known structure